Craig Evans (born 26 February 1965) is a former Australian rules footballer who played with Geelong and the Brisbane Bears in the Victorian Football League (VFL).

Evans was a local Geelong recruit, from the Grovedale Football Club. He appeared in nine games for Geelong during the 1986 VFL season and was then one of the players offered up by the club to the Brisbane Bears.

At Brisbane for their inaugural league season, Evans had to wait until round 11 for his first game. He made his debut for the Bears in a fixture against Hawthorn at Carrara Oval and he kicked two goals. The following week he played in a loss to Essendon, in what would be his last VFL game.

References

1965 births
Australian rules footballers from Victoria (Australia)
Geelong Football Club players
Brisbane Bears players
Grovedale Football Club players
Living people